Masoom is a 2014 Indian Bengali-language film.

Cast
 Rittika Sen
 Akash Chowdhury
 Sabyasachi Chakraborty
 Manjushree Ganguly 
Akash Singh

Music & Audio
The film's music, sound design & audio post-production was done  by Sanjib Sarkar  
Sung by Sanchita Bhattacharya, Rupam Islam, Sanjib Sarkar, Madhuri Dey & Mahalakshmi Iyer

Soundtrack

Synopsis
The story about an innocent teenage couple who grow a very good friendship between them. Belonging to a vital period of their time, this is to say adolescence, just with a beckon of sex, their life changes. Actually the story want to hit the core area of the education system of West Bengal. There is a very bad tendency amongst the parents that they try to hide things from the eyes of their children instead of explaining those. As a result of that, the curiosity plays an important role behind their sub conscious minds. Sometimes in adolescence, without getting proper explanation and driven by the thoughts at the back of their minds, they commit many mistakes.

Awards

References

External links
 

2014 films
Films shot in West Bengal
Bengali-language Indian films
2010s Bengali-language films